Lakshmangudi is a suburb of Koothanallur in Koothanallur taluk  in Thiruvarur district, Tamil Nadu, India. The postal code is 614102.

References

Villages in Tiruvarur district